The 2020 Jackson State Tigers football team represented Jackson State University in the 2020–21 NCAA Division I FCS football season. The Tigers were led by Pro Football Hall of Famer and first-year head coach Deion Sanders and played their home games at Mississippi Veterans Memorial Stadium in Jackson, Mississippi as members of the East Division of the Southwestern Athletic Conference (SWAC).

On July 20, 2020, the Southwestern Athletic Conference announced that it would not play fall sports due to the COVID-19 pandemic, which includes the football program. The conference ultimately moved its football schedule to the 2021 spring semester.

Schedule
Due to the SWAC's postponement of the 2020 football season to spring 2021, games against Florida A&M, Langston, Southern Miss, and Tennessee State were canceled. The SWAC released updated spring schedules on August 17.

Staff

Game summaries

Edward Waters

at Grambling State

Mississippi Valley State

at Alabama State

Southern

Alabama A&M

References

Jackson State
Jackson State Tigers football seasons
Jackson State Tigers football